Züschen is a village and former city in the municipality of Fritzlar, Schwalm-Eder-Kreis in the German State of Hesse.

Villages in Hesse